Jeong In-hong (26 September 1535 – 3 April 1623) was a scholar-official of the Joseon period of Korea. A general and a leader of the Northerners faction. He served as Chief State Councillor during the reign of Gwanghaegun. His pen name was Raeam (also Naeam, 래암 來庵). He belonged to the Seosan Jeong clan.

Family 
Grandfather
 Jeong Yeon-woo (정언우, 鄭彦佑)
 Father
 Jeong Ryu (정륜, 鄭倫)
 Mother 
 Lady Kang of the Jinju Kang clan (진주 강씨) (? - 1582)
 Paternal uncle
 Jeong Geon (정건)
 Siblings
 Unnamed younger brother
 Younger brother - Jeong In-yeong (정인영, 鄭仁榮) (1540 - 1602)
 Wife and children 
 Lady Yang of the Namwon Yang clan (남원 양씨)
 Son - Jeong Yeon (정연, 鄭沇) (1571 - 1592)
 Daughter-in-law - Lady Ha of the Jinju Ha clan (진주 하씨)
 Grandson - Jeong Neung (정능, 鄭 木+菱)

Works 

 Naeamjip (내암집, 來庵集)

Popular culture 
Portrayed by Seo Sang-ik in the 1995 KBS2 TV Series West Palace.
 Portrayed by Han Myung-koo in the 2015 MBC TV series Splendid Politics.

See also 
 Cho Shik
 Lee San-hae

References 

 Kim Haboush, JaHyun and Martina Deuchler (1999). Culture and the State in Late Chosŏn Korea.  Cambridge: Harvard University Press. ; .
 Lee, Peter H. (1993). Sourcebook of Korean Civilization, Vol. 1. New York: Columbia University Press. ; ; ; .
 Noh, Daehwan. "The Eclectic Development of Neo-Confucianism and Statecraft from the 18th to the 19th Century", Korea Journal. Winter 2003.

External links 
 Chung In-hong 
 Chung In-hong 
 Chung In-hong:Navercast 

1535 births
1623 deaths
Neo-Confucian scholars
Korean educators
16th-century Korean poets
17th-century Korean poets
Joseon scholar-officials
Korean scholars
Executed Korean people
Korean Confucianists
16th-century Korean philosophers
Executed politicians
17th-century executions by Korea
Seosan Jeong clan